The 2018–19 Bethune–Cookman Wildcats women's basketball team represents Bethune–Cookman University during the 2018–19 NCAA Division I women's basketball season. The Wildcats, led by ninth year head coach Vanessa Blair-Lewis, play their home games at the Moore Gymnasium, as members of the Mid-Eastern Athletic Conference. They finished the season 21–11, 11–5 in MEAC play to finish in third place. They won the MEAC women's tournament and earn their first automatic bid of the NCAA women's tournament in school history, where they lost to Notre Dame in the first round.

Roster

Schedule and results

|-
!colspan=9 style=| Non-conference regular season

|-
!colspan=9 style=| MEAC regular season

|-
!colspan=9 style=| MEAC Women's Tournament

|-
!colspan=9 style=| NCAA Women's Tournament

See also
 2018–19 Bethune–Cookman Wildcats men's basketball team

References

Bethune–Cookman Wildcats women's basketball
Bethune-Cookman Wildcats
Bethune-Cookman Wildcats women's basketball team
Bethune-Cookman Wildcats women's basketball team
Bethune-Cookman